Guastica semilutea is a moth of the family Pyralidae first described by Francis Walker in 1863. It is found in Sri Lanka, Thailand, Malaysia, Sumatra and Borneo.

References

Pyralinae
Moths of Asia
Moths described in 1863